The Magni M-14 Scout is an Italian autogyro, designed and produced by Magni Gyro srl of Besnate. The aircraft is supplied as a complete ready-to-fly-aircraft.

Design and development
The M-14 features a single main rotor, a two-seats-in a tandem open cockpit with a windshield, tricycle landing gear with wheel pants and a four-cylinder, air and liquid-cooled, four-stroke, dual-ignition  Rotax 912S engine in pusher configuration. The turbocharged  Rotax 914 powerplant is optional.

The aircraft fuselage is made from TIG-welded 4130 steel tubing, while the cockpit fairing is fibreglass. The propeller is a three-bladed carbon fibre, ground adjustable type. Electric trim is standard equipment, as is a Flydat digital engine monitor. The second seat is located right behind the pilot's seat without a separate cockpit, dual controls or windshield and is intended for occasional use to carry a passenger. The pilot's seat includes an integral  fuel tank that provides three hours endurance.

Specifications (M-14 Scout)

References

External links

2000s Italian sport aircraft
Single-engined pusher autogyros
Magni aircraft